Daliso Chaponda (born 29 November 1979) is a Zambian-born Malawian stand-up comedian living in England. In 2017, he became a finalist in the variety show Britain's Got Talent, finishing third overall. In 2018 he launched a BBC Radio 4 series  Daliso Chaponda: Citizen of Nowhere.

Early life
Chaponda was born in Zambia in 1979 and spent several years between multiple African countries before going to Malawi at the age of 11. His parents were from Malawi, but had fled the country due to the dictatorship of Hastings Banda. His father George Chaponda  worked as a lawyer for the United Nations High Commissioner for Refugees, so the family lived in various countries such as Thailand, Australia and Switzerland. His family later returned to Malawi, and George Chaponda was eventually appointed the Minister of Foreign Affairs and Minister of Education by Bingu wa Mutharika.

Daliso Chaponda attended Waterford Kamhlaba United World College of Southern Africa, and went on to further education at McGill University and Concordia University in Canada, where he studied computer programming and English literature.

Career
Chaponda began his career in 2001 while he was in Canada. To hone his craft, he focused on stand-up clubs and open mic nights. His very first headlining show, Feed This Black Man, was at Concordia University in 2002. In 2006, he moved to the United Kingdom where he opened for other comedians such as John Bishop. During this period, he appeared in venues in the United Kingdom, as well as abroad in South Africa and Australia.

In 2008, he appeared in the Edinburgh Festival Fringe's "Best of the Fest". In 2009, he performed for the first time in Malawi. The same year, he also opened for Canadian comedian Sugar Sammy in Dubai and Jordan.  In 2012, Chaponda made a joke about the Malawian flag during one of his "Laughrica" shows in Malawi. The government subsequently threatened to arrest him for insulting the flag. In 2014, he co-wrote a BBC Radio 4 drama-comedy series inspired by the incident, Sibusiso Mamba's When the Laughter Stops.

In 2017, Chaponda auditioned for the television talent series Britain's Got Talent. Judge Amanda Holden used her "golden buzzer" to help him advance to the semi-finals. Chaponda eventually came third in the competition.

As a result of his appearance on Britain's Got Talent, Chaponda signed with BBC Radio 4 to create a new series called Daliso Chaponda: Citizen of Nowhere, begun in 2018, totalling by 2021 twelve half-hour episodes, rebroadcast on BBC Radio 4 Extra in 2022. He began his first headlining world tour What the African Said... in February 2018.

Chaponda has appeared in three episodes of QI.

Influences
Chaponda has said in interviews that he admires many standup comedians, but has been most influenced by humorous authors such as George Bernard Shaw and Roald Dahl.

References

External links
Official website
Interview with Chaponda on The Comedian's Comedian

Malawian stand-up comedians
People educated at a United World College
Concordia University alumni
McGill University alumni
1979 births
Britain's Got Talent contestants
Comedians from Manchester
British male comedians
Living people